Stephen Leigh Halfpenny (born 22 December 1988) is a Welsh rugby union player who plays as a fullback or wing for the Scarlets, Wales and the British & Irish Lions. Halfpenny is the third highest points scorer for Wales after Neil Jenkins and Stephen Jones.

Early life 
Halfpenny is from Gorseinon, in Swansea.  He attended Pontybrenin Primary School and Penyrheol Comprehensive School.

Early career
A winger or fullback, Halfpenny was signed as a youth by the Ospreys and played the 2005–06 season with the Ospreys U18s. Halfpenny then trained with Neath RFC during the 2006–07 season, before signing for the Cardiff Blues and spending the whole 2007–08 season playing for feeder club Cardiff RFC, before making his regional debut against Ulster at the Ravenhill Stadium in May 2008, scoring three conversions in the 17–26 victory.

Club career
On 18 April 2009, Halfpenny scored two tries for the Cardiff Blues in the final of the EDF Energy Cup, a 50–12 win over Gloucester at Twickenham. In January 2014 Halfpenny announced that he would be leaving the Blues at the end of the 2013–14 season after signing a two-year deal with French giants Toulon.

Halfpenny did not complete the 2013–14 season due to receiving a dislocated shoulder in the RBS Six Nations match against England. Thus his final match with the Blues was against Exeter Chiefs on 18 January, where the Blues lost 13–19. Halfpenny contributed a conversion and two penalties to the game.

On 16 September 2014, Toulon president Mourad Boudjellal said that he may terminate Halfpenny's contract due to reoccurring injury problems, though this was later resolved. Halfpenny finally made his Toulon debut on 12 October 2014, two months after the start of the Top 14 season.

On 2 May 2015, Halfpenny scored 14 points in the 2015 European Rugby Champions Cup Final as Toulon beat Clermont to claim record third successive European title.

On 3 August 2017, Halfpenny returned home to Wales to sign for regional team Scarlets on a three-year contract, which is a National Dual Contract with the Welsh Rugby Union, from the 2017–18 season.

International career

Wales

2008–11
As a former Wales Under-20 international, Halfpenny received his first call-up for the Wales senior national team in October 2008 ahead of the 2008 Autumn internationals. He made his debut in the first game of the autumn series against world champions South Africa on 8 November 2008, at the age of 19. He scored his first points from a penalty kick in the 20–15 loss. He went on to score his first two tries on his second cap against Canada a week later.

Halfpenny was selected on the right wing for Wales' 2009 Six Nations game against Scotland, on 8 February, and again on 14 February, against rivals England. He scored a try in each match and kicked a penalty against England to add to that. His points proved to be the difference between the two teams. He then played against France in a match that Wales lost 21–16 in Saint-Denis. Warren Gatland then dropped Halfpenny for the 20–15 win over Italy, as Warren Gatland experimented with winger Mark Jones.

Halfpenny was a key part of the Wales squad for the following two campaigns but he was constantly plagued by injury.  Coach Warren Gatland had faith in Halfpenny, and the Blues winger did enough to force his way into the squad for the 2011 World Cup. During the World Cup, Halfpenny impressed in many positions, particularly at fullback. It was also in this game that Halfpenny became first choice kicker, ahead of fly-halves Rhys Priestland and James Hook. In the semi-final against France, Halfpenny attempted a 47-yard penalty that would have taken Wales to the final. However, the kick fell just short.

2012–present
During the 2012 Six Nations, Halfpenny cemented his place at fullback and became one of the standout players of the tournament, finishing as top point scorer of the tournament. Some of his points came at crucial points within the tournament. Down 21–20 to Ireland in the 80th minutes, Halfpenny sent a penalty over to give Wales a 23–21 win over the hosts, and subsequently completed another four penalties and a conversion as Wales toppled England. Then, in the final match against France, Wales got a 16–9 win, with Halfpenny converting three further penalties and a conversion.
In the final match of the 2012 Winter Test series against Australia, Halfpenny suffered a neck injury while attempting to stop the winning try. He was taken to hospital but was discharged the next day without any serious damage. Halfpenny was named man of the match.

In the first match of the 2013 Six Nations Championship, Halfpenny scored the 2nd try for Wales in their 30–22 loss to Ireland at the Millennium Stadium. The following week he earned the man of the match award when Wales beat France 16–6 in Paris. Again two weeks later in Rome when Wales beat Italy 26–9, he was made Man of the Match by the Italian broadcaster. With over 80,000 people voting between 15 shortlisted 2013 Six Nations players, Halfpenny was also named player of the tournament, securing 40% of the overall vote.
In November 2013 Halfpenny was named in a shortlist of five players for the IRB Player of the Year. In December 2013 Halfpenny was selected as BBC Wales Sports Personality of the Year and was runner-up for BBC Sports Personality of the Year to Andy Murray.

In March 2014, Halfpenny was ruled out for the rest of the season after he dislocated his right shoulder in the 29–18 defeat to England in the 2014 Six Nations Championship.
In October 2014, Halfpenny was included in the 34-man squad for the 2014 Autumn internationals against Australia, Fiji, New Zealand and South Africa. He scored 27 points during the Autumn series including all 12 of Wales's points in a famous win over South Africa, only the second in their history.

In September 2015 Halfpenny was ruled out of the Rugby World Cup after rupturing an anterior cruciate knee ligament during Wales' 23–19 warm up win over Italy at the Millennium Stadium.

In 2021, in a Wales match against Canada, he earned his 96th cap for Wales and, with four Lions caps, his 100th international cap, but a knee injury in the first minute put him out of the game.

Lions
Halfpenny was included in the British & Irish Lions squad for their 2009 tour to South Africa.
He missed the start of the Lions tour due to a thigh injury requiring treatment, but once fit he rejoined Ian McGeechan's Lions squad in South Africa on 2 June. He played in the tour match against Free State Cheetahs on 6 June. However, Halfpenny then withdrew from the Lions squad due to a recurrence of the thigh injury.

Halfpenny was selected for the 2013 British & Irish Lions tour to Australia as one of three fullbacks touring along with Stuart Hogg and Rob Kearney. Halfpenny played all three tests, winning player of the series, and breaking the Lions points record held by Neil Jenkins. He also broke the Lions record for most points in one test.

International tries

Professional points record

References

External links

Scarlets Profile
WRU Profile
Lions Profile

1988 births
Living people
British & Irish Lions rugby union players from Wales
Cardiff Rugby players
People educated at Penyrheol Comprehensive School
RC Toulonnais players
Rugby union fullbacks
Rugby union players from Gorseinon
Rugby union wings
Wales international rugby union players
Scarlets players
Welsh rugby union players